Máximo González and Sebastián Prieto were the defending champions, but they didn't participate together this year.
Prieto played with Horacio Zeballos, but they were eliminated by Juan Pablo Brzezicki and David Marrero already in the first round.
González played with Lucas Arnold Ker and they reached the final, where they lost to Brian Dabul and Sergio Roitman 4–6, 5–7.

Seeds

Draw

Draw

References
 Doubles Draw

Copa Petrobras Buenos Aires - Doubles
Copa Petrobras Buenos Aires